Nafessa Williams is an American actress. She is most known for her 2011 role as Nicole Gordon in the Meek Mill film Streets, her 2011 role as Deanna Forbes on the ABC soap opera One Life to Live, and her 2016 role as Dr. Charlotte Piel on the CBS drama Code Black. From 2018 to 2021, she has played Anissa Pierce in The CW's Black Lightning. Williams portrayed Robyn Crawford in the 2022 Whitney Houston biopic Whitney Houston: I Wanna Dance with Somebody.

Early life and education
Williams was raised in West Philadelphia. She attended Robert E. Lamberton High School. Williams studied criminal justice at West Chester University and interned in the homicide unit of the District Attorney's Office.

Career
In 2010, Williams was cast opposite Philadelphia rapper Meek Mill in Streets. The film was released in 2012. In March 2011, it was announced that Williams would join the cast of ABC's One Life to Live in the contract role of Deanna. When Williams auditioned, the character was only supposed to appear in three episodes. However by the time of her debut, Williams had signed a four-year contract. Only a month into her stint, it was announced that ABC had decided to cancel the series. Williams was released from her contract early and last appeared in July 2011.

In March 2012, Williams announced that she would be appearing on the CBS soap opera The Bold and the Beautiful. Williams made her debut on May 8, 2012. However, the role was short lived and Williams only appeared in two episodes. In 2015, Williams appeared in the Queen Latifah executive produced feature film, Brotherly Love, opposite Keke Palmer. In April 2016, Williams was cast in the Showtime continuation of the 1990s ABC drama Twin Peaks. In July 2016, Williams was cast in the recurring role of Charlotte on the CBS prime time drama, Code Black. In 2017, Williams was cast as Anissa Pierce in the 2018 Mara Brock Akil/Greg Berlanti series Black Lightning.

In May and June 2019, Williams, DC Comics Co-Publisher Jim Lee, writer Tom King, and fellow CW series actresses Candice Patton and Danielle Panabaker toured five U.S. military bases in Kuwait with the United Service Organizations (USO), where they visited the approximately 12,000 U.S. military personnel stationed in that country as part of DC's 80th anniversary of Batman celebration.

Filmography

Film and TV Movies

Television

Video Games

References

Further reading

External links

Living people
Actresses from Philadelphia
African-American actresses
American soap opera actresses
American television actresses
West Chester University alumni
21st-century American actresses
Year of birth missing (living people)
21st-century African-American women